Cripple Creek may refer to:

Populated places

 Cripple Creek, Colorado
 Cripple Creek, Virginia

Streams

 Cripple Creek (Colorado), a river
 Cripple Creek (East Fork Stones River), a stream in Tennessee
 Cripple Creek (Virginia), a river
 Cripple Creek (New York), a river

Songs

 "Cripple Creek" (folk song), a traditional folk song
 "Cripple Creek" by Skip Spence on the album Oar
 "Up on Cripple Creek" by The Band on their self-titled album The Band
 "Cripple Creek Ferry" by Neil Young on the album After the Gold Rush

Films
 Cripple Creek (film), a 1952 Western film directed by Ray Nazarro